Rovibronic coupling denotes the simultaneous interactions between rotational, vibrational, and electronic degrees of freedom in a molecule. When a rovibronic transition occurs, the rotational, vibrational, and electronic states change simultaneously, unlike in rovibrational coupling. The coupling can be observed spectroscopically and is most easily seen in the Renner–Teller effect in which a linear polyatomic molecule is in a degenerate electronic state and bending vibrations will cause a large rovibronic coupling.

See also 
 Afterglow plasma
 Vibronic coupling

Rotation
Molecular vibration